Tiffany McDaniel (born in 1985) is an American author from Circleville, Ohio. She is of Cherokee heritage. She started writing as a child. As a self-taught author with no formal education, McDaniel wrote several unpublished pieces before her first publication in 2016. Her novels The Summer That Melted Everything (2016), Betty (2020), and On the Savage Side (exp. 2023) are set in the fictional town of Breathed, Ohio. She found inspiration in the books of Shirley Jackson and Flannery O'Conner. She is a winner of several international literary prizes.

References

Living people
American women writers
Writers from Ohio
1985 births